Lau Sze-wa is a Hong Kong rugby union player. She was part of Hong Kong's historic 2017 Women's Rugby World Cup squad.

References 

1988 births
Living people
Hong Kong people
Hong Kong rugby union players
Hong Kong female rugby union players